Quelli della speciale is an Italian television series.

See also
List of Italian television series

References

External links

Italian television series
1993 Italian television series debuts
1993 Italian television series endings